Chris Air was a low-fares airline, based in Suceava, Romania which started up and ended in 2005. It was the first airline to fly internationally from Suceava. Its partner airline was Airday, based in Ancona, Italy.

Services
The airline flew from Suceava Airport to the following destinations:

Barcelona, Spain
Ancona, Italy
Pescara, Italy
Athens, Greece

External links
Chris Air

References

Defunct airlines of Romania
Airlines established in 2005
Airlines disestablished in 2005
Romanian companies established in 2005